Cragford is an unincorporated community in Clay County, Alabama, United States, located  southeast of Lineville. Cragford has a post office with ZIP code 36255.

References

Unincorporated communities in Clay County, Alabama
Unincorporated communities in Alabama